"Ramenez la coupe à la maison" ("Bring the Cup Back Home") is a song by French musician Vegedream. It was released on 19 July 2018, a few days after the France national football team won at the 2018 FIFA World Cup. The song reached number one on the French Singles Chart in its second week of release.

Charts

Weekly charts

Year-end charts

Certifications

References

2018 singles
2018 songs
French-language songs
SNEP Top Singles number-one singles
FIFA World Cup songs
Association football songs and chants
Sports television theme songs